Zheng Yi (also romanised as Cheng Yud or Cheng I ; born Zheng Wenxian, courtesy name Youyi; 1765 – 16 November 1807) was a powerful Chinese pirate operating from Guangdong and throughout the South China Sea in the late 1700s.

History

He was born Zheng Wenxian in 1765 in Xin'an County, Guangdong, Qing China. His family, including his father Zheng Lianchang and his younger brother Zheng San had been pirates for generations, he and other pirates were recruited as mercenaries by Tây Sơn dynasty up until 1801. In the year of about 1798, Zheng Yi kidnapped Cheung Po, a 15-year-old son of a Tankan fisherman and pressed him into piracy. Cheung Po's natural talent helped him adapt well to his unplanned new career, and he rose swiftly through the ranks.

In 1801, the nefarious intrigues of the 26 year old Cantonese floating brothel madame or prostitute known as Shi Xianggu, known for her shrewd business savvy and trade in secrets through the pillow talk of her wealthy and political clientele, caught his attention. Either he became infatuated with her or purely as a business move, Zheng Yi made a proposal of marriage to Shi Xianggu to consolidate the powers of intrigue, as it were, which she is said to have agreed to by formal contract granting her a 50% control and share. Shi Xianggu was known as "Zheng Yi Sao" (. They adopted Cheung Po as their step-son, making him Zheng's legal heir. She also bore him two sons; Zheng Ying Shi and Zheng Xiong Shi.

Zheng Yi used military assertion and his reputation to consolidate a coalition of competing Cantonese pirate fleets of uncertain numbers into an alliance. By 1804, this coalition was a formidable force, and one of the most powerful pirate fleets in all of China. They were known as the Red Flag Fleet.

The pirate coalition besieged Macau for several weeks in 1804. In September 1805, a Chinese attack consisting of 80 gunboats in Guangzhou Bay captured or destroyed only 26 pirate vessels. The general who had led the attack subsequently offered pardons to those who surrendered; perhaps 3000 accepted this offer before it was withdrawn in December 1805.

By 1806, virtually every Chinese vessel along the coast paid the pirates for ostensible protection.

Death
Zheng Yi died suddenly in Nguyễn Vietnam on 16 November 1807, sources varied on whether he died in a typhoon, falling overboard in an accident, or if he was killed by his wife, or his new heir. Soon after his death, his widow Ching Shih (meaning "widow of Zheng") acted quickly to solidify the partnership with her step-son Cheung Po Tsai. The two soon became intimate. Their first success came when they are able to secure the loyalty of Zheng's relatives. Cheung Po Tsai, would act as Ching Shih's second-in-command of the Red Flag Fleet.

See also
Pirates of the South China Coast
Zheng Qi
Ching Shih
Cheung Po Tsai

References

Chinese pirates
1765 births
1807 deaths
19th-century pirates